Pratap Chandra Sarangi (born 4 January 1955), was a Minister of State in the Government of India for Animal Husbandry, Dairying and Fisheries and Micro, Small and Medium Enterprises. He is a Politician from Balasore, Odisha and serves as a National Executive member of the Bharatiya Janata Party (BJP). He won Odisha Legislative Assembly, two times: from 2004 to 2009 and from 2009 to 2014, both times from Nilagiri constituency.

He revolutionalised primary education in rural areas through the innovative concept of community funded Ekal Vidyalaya or single teacher schools.

Early life and education
Pratap Chandra Sarangi was born on 4 January 1955 in the village of Gopinathpur, Nilagiri, Balasore into a Brahmin family. He completed his bachelor's degree at Fakir Mohan College, Balasore under Utkal university in 1975.

Since his childhood, Sarangi was a spiritual seeker. He wanted to become a monk of the Ramakrishna Math. He made several visits to Belur Math, the headquarters of the Ramakrishna Order in Howrah, West Bengal. The monks of the Math discussed with Sarangi about his desire and examined his biodata. They discovered that Sarangi's widowed mother was alive. They insisted that he should go back and serve her. After his return to his village, he became involved in various social activities.

Career

Initially, Sarangi served as a district level volunteer of the Rashtriya Swayamsevak Sangh and also worked for the Vishwa Hindu Parishad and Bajrang Dal. He opened schools for the poor called Samar Kara Kendra, under the Gana Shikhsa Mandir Yojana in tribal villages in Balasore and Mayurbhanj District.

His main part of his life is as a Head Clerk in Nilgiri College, Nilgiri, Balasore, Odisha. He also contested in the 2014 Indian general election from Balasore, Lok Sabha constituency as a BJP candidate, which he lost. He contested again in the 2019 Indian general election from Balasore, Lok Sabha constituency as a BJP candidate, in which he defeated the Biju Janata Dal candidate and sitting MP, Rabindra Kumar Jena, by a margin of 12,956 votes.

In May 2019, Sarangi became Minister of State for Micro, Small and Medium Enterprises and Animal Husbandry, Dairying and Fisheries.

Controversies 
In 1999 Australian Christian missionary Graham Staines and his two children were burnt to death whilst sleeping in their station wagon in the village of Manoharpur-Keonjhar in Odisha, allegedly by a gang of Bajrang Dal. Pratap Sarangi was the chief of the Bajrang Dal during the year 1999. After the trial, a man named Dara Singh who had links to the Bajrang Dal, and 12 others were convicted of the crime in 2003. Mr. Sarangi denied the fact saying that the investigation was not done in an unbiased and proper way. The high court in Odisha commuted a death sentence for Singh two years later and freed 11 others who were sentenced to life-term prison citing no evidence against the accused, including Pratap Sarangi. Although an official inquiry by the Wadhwa Commission, found no evidence of any one single group's involvement in the attack, 13 people associated with Bajrang Dal were later convicted. Another official inquiry by the National Commission for Minorities found that the killers cheered " bajrang dal Zindabad" before the attack.

He was also arrested on charges of rioting, arson, assault and damaging government property after a 2002 attack on the Orissa state assembly by Hindu right-wing groups, including the Bajrang Dal.

See also
 Ekal Vidyalaya

References

1955 births
Living people
Members of the Odisha Legislative Assembly
People from Balasore district
Bharatiya Janata Party politicians from Odisha
National Democratic Alliance candidates in the 2014 Indian general election
India MPs 2019–present
Narendra Modi ministry
Odisha MLAs 2004–2009
Odisha MLAs 2009–2014
Bajrang Dal members
People charged with assault
Hinduism-motivated violence in India
Hindu nationalists
Odia people